Gimhae International Airport  (formerly Kimhae International Airport) is located on the western end of Busan, South Korea. The name "Gimhae" comes from the nearby city of Gimhae. It opened in 1976. A new international terminal opened on October 31, 2007. Gimhae International Airport is the main hub for Air Busan, Asiana Airlines and Korean Air. Runway 18L/36R is used for military purposes only for Gimhae Air Base, but due to increasing traffic, there are plans to open the runway for airliners. In 2018, 17,064,613 passengers used the airport.

As the airport is now beyond its design capacity and surrounded with mountains, buildings etc, a new airport is proposed to be built on Gadeokdo to meet growing demand. Because the airport is shared with the military, photography and video of the apron, runway, and military facilities are strictly prohibited.

History
In March 2007, Lufthansa inaugurated service to Munich via Seoul using Airbus A340s. The airline withdrew from Busan seven years later, however.

Airlines and destinations

Traffic and statistics

Passengers

Top carriers

In 2022, the ten carriers with the largest percentage of passengers flying into, out of, or through Gimhae International Airport are as follows:

Top destinations

Ground transportation

Metro

 Busan-Gimhae Light Rail Transit : Gimhae International Airport Station

Bus

Airport Limousine Bus
 Gimhae International Airport (from Airport to Busan station) International Terminal - Domestic Terminal - Paik Hospital intersection - Gaya Homeplus mart - Gaya Hyudai apt - Seomyeon (Lotte Hotel Busan) - Seomyeon, Busan - Beomil (Hyundai dep. store) - Jin market - Busanjin station (Busan Metro) - Busan station - Toyoko inn Hotel - Jungang - Guangbokdong Lotte dep. store - Nampo - Jagalchi (Chungmudong) 
 Gimhae International Airport (from Busan Station to Airport) Jagalchi (Chungmudong) - Nampo - Guangbokdong Lotte dep. store - Jungang - Yeongjudong - Busan station - Busanjin station (Busan Metro) - Beomil (Hyundai dep. store) -Seomyeon, Busan (Judies Taehwa) - Seomyeon (Lotte Hotel Busan) - Gaya Hyudai apt - Gaya Homeplus mart - Paik Hospital intersection - Airport (International Terminal) 
 Gimhae International Airport (International Terminal) - Domestic Terminal - Namcheon (Namcheondong) - Gwangan (Gwangandong) - Suyeong (Suyeong Intersection) - Millak (Suyeong Hyudai apt) - Centum City (Centum hotel) - Bexco - Olympic intersection - Gyeongnam Marina apt - Hyundai park hiatt hotel - Hanhwa resort - Hyperion - Westin Chosun Hotel - Grand Hotel - Novotel Ambassador - Paradise Hotel - Mipo, moon-ten road - Remian Haeundae apt - Hyundai ipark apt - Jangsan - Haeundae Paik Hospital - Dongbu apartment - Daelim 1cha apt - Yangwoon high school - Yangwoon middle school - Yangwoon high school - Daedong apt - Dongbu apartment - Haeundae Paik Hospital - Jangsan Station - Hyundai ipark apt - Remian Haeundae apt - Mipo, moon-ten road - Novotel Ambassador - Paradise Hotel - Seacloud hotel - Grand Hotel - Westin Chosun Hotel - Hyperion - Hanhwa resort - Hyundai park hiatt hotel - Gyeongnam Marina apt - Olympic intersection - Homeplus mart - Centum City (Centum hotel) - Millak (Suyeong Hyudai apt) - Suyeong (Suyeong Intersection) - Gwangan (Gwangandong)  - Namcheon (Namcheondong) - Airport (International Terminal, Departure) - Domestic Terminal, Arrival - the bus operates from 06:50 to 22:00, every 15~20 minutes

Express Bus
 1009 : Geumgok-dong ↔ Deokcheon station ↔ Gupo station ↔ Gangseo-gu Office ↔ Gimhae Airport ↔ Myeongji ↔ Noksan indus. complex ↔ Busan New Port ↔ Gadeok-do Sunchang The bus operates from 05:20 to 20:50, every 40 minutes (Depart from Geumgok)

City Bus
 307 : Gimhae Airport ↔ Gangseo-gu Office ↔ Gupo station ↔ Gupo Market ↔ Deokcheon station ↔ Mandeok ↔ Dongnae ↔ Centum City (BEXCO) ↔ Haeundae The bus operates 05:15, from 06:15 to 23:20, every 15~20 minutes

Village Bus
 Gangseo No. 11 : Ulman ↔ Gimhae Int'l Airport ↔ Gangseo-gu Office ↔ Buk-gu Office ↔ Gupo station ↔ Deokcheon station (Gupo Market)
 Gangseo No. 13 : Hadan ↔ Eulsukdo ↔ Myeongji ↔ Deokdu ↔ Gimhae Int'l Airport ↔ Gangseo-gu Office ↔ Buk-gu Office ↔ Gupo station ↔ Gupo Market ↔ Deokcheon station (Deokcheon JCT)

Intercity Bus
Masan, Changwon, Jinhae, Jangyu, Gimhae, Pohang, Gyeongju, Gumi, Dongdaegu, Ulsan, Eonyang, Yangsan, Gohyeon, Okpo, Jangseungpo

Curfew
The curfew prevents aircraft from taking off or landing between the hours of 23:00 and 06:00.

Incidents and accidents
On January 31, 2001, a McDonnell Douglas DC-10-40, operating as Japan Airlines Flight 958 was en route from Gimhae to Narita International Airport narrowly avoided a mid-air collision with another Japan Airlines plane over Yaizu in Suruga Bay.  All 250 people on the DC-10 were uninjured.
On April 15, 2002, a Boeing 767-200ER, operating as Air China Flight 129 from Beijing Capital International Airport to Busan, crashed into a hill while trying to land at Gimhae during inclement weather, killing 129 of the 166 people on board.

See also

 Gimhae Air Base
 Pusan East (K-9) Air Base
 Transportation in South Korea

References

External links

Gimhae International Airport English homepage
Information about Gimhae International Airport

Airports in South Korea
Transport in Busan
Transport in Gimhae
Gangseo District, Busan
Airports established in 1976
1976 establishments in South Korea
20th-century architecture in South Korea